Tiago Rodrigues dos Reis (born 14 August 1999), known as Tiago Reis, is a Brazilian football player who plays as a striker for Botafogo-PB.

Club career
Born in Brasília, Federal District, Tiago Reis joined Goiás' youth setup in 2015, after impressing on a trial. In 2017 he moved to Cruzeiro, but was released in the following year.

On 6 August 2018, Tiago Reis joined Vasco da Gama, being initially assigned to the under-20 squad. Promoted to the main squad after impressing in the 2019 Copa São Paulo de Futebol Júnior, he made his first team debut on 2 March by coming on as a second-half substitute for fellow youth graduate Marrony in a 2–0 Campeonato Carioca home win against Boavista.

Tiago Reis scored his first senior goal on 20 March 2019, netting the opener in a 2–0 away defeat of Resende.

Career statistics

Honours

Individual
 Campeonato Carioca Revelation of the Year: 2019

References

External links
Vasco da Gama profile 

1999 births
Living people
Footballers from Brasília
Brazilian footballers
Association football forwards
CR Vasco da Gama players